The British records in swimming are ratified by the United Kingdom's governing body in swimming, British Swimming. Records can be set in long course (50 metres) or short course (25 metres) swimming pools, with records currently recorded in the following events for both men and women.
Freestyle: 50 m, 100 m, 200 m, 400 m, 800 m, 1500 m
Backstroke: 50 m, 100 m, 200 m
Breaststroke: 50 m, 100 m, 200 m
Butterfly: 50 m, 100 m, 200 m
Individual medley: 100 m (short course only), 200 m, 400 m
Relays: 4×50 m freestyle (short course only), 4 × 100 m freestyle, 4 × 200 m freestyle, 4×50 m freestyle (short course only), 4 × 100 m medley
The relay records displayed here are the definitive national relay records, however a separate set of national relay records for club teams is recorded by British Swimming, but are not shown here. Records can be set at intermediate distances in an individual race and for the first leg of a relay race.

The ratification process and involves submission of an application by the swimmer to British Swimming detailing the name(s) of the swimmer, time swum, date and location of the swim, names of officials and the swimsuit model worn. Upon ratification, the records appear on the official records listing. Records which have not yet been fully ratified are marked with a '#' symbol in these lists, and all records were achieved in finals unless otherwise noted.

Long course (50 m)

Men

Women

Mixed relay

Short course (25 m)

Men

Women

Mixed relay

Gallery
Some of the current British record holders:

References
General
 19 July 2022 updated
 11 August 2022 updated
 11 January 2023 updated
 11 January 2023 updated
Specific

External links
British Swimming official website

Britain
Swimming
Records
Swimming records